Jan Muhammad Baloch (  3 August 2012; sometimes spelled Jan Mohammad Baloch), was a Pakistani former olympian boxer, coach of the Pakistan national boxing team appointed by the Pakistan Boxing Federation and the founder of RCD Boxing Club. He made his international debut with 1970 British Commonwealth Games and represented the country in four Asian Games, including 1972 Summer Olympics, 1978 Asian boxing tournament and RCD Boxing Championship administered or organised by the Turkish Boxing Federation.

In 1976, he appeared in the Quaid-e-Azam International Boxing tournament in Karachi, leading him to become the recipient of a silver medal. Later in 1975, he became the recipient of a gold medal during his participation in the RCD Boxing Championship held in Ankara.

Biography 
He was born in 1950 in Lyari village of Karachi. He had ten children, including a daughter suffering from polio.

Career 

He started his boxing career at the apparent age of ten and was later assigned to the Muslim Azad Boxing Club in 1972. He subsequently became the recipient of a gold medal after participating in an uncertain National Championship in Lahore and retained his position as a national champion under his category until he retired in 1979.

In 1973, he participated in the Hilali Cup held in Colombo, leading him to become the recipient of another gold medal and a bronze medal in 1974 at the Tehran Asian Games. He also participated in the 1977 Asian Amateur Boxing Championships.

He later worked as a boxing coach for over twenty years. He was also associated with the Pakistan Navy, railways and Karachi Electric Supply Company (in modern-day K-Electric).

Death 
He was suffering from liver cancer and died in Karachi on 3 August 2012. He is buried at Mewa Shah Graveyard of Sindh.

References

Further reading 
 
 

1950 births
2012 deaths
Sportspeople from Karachi
Pakistani male boxers
Boxers at the 1972 Summer Olympics
Boxers at the 1970 British Commonwealth Games
Boxers at the 1978 Asian Games
Boxers at the 1974 Asian Games
South Asian Games gold medalists for Pakistan
Asian Games silver medalists for Pakistan
Asian Games bronze medalists for Pakistan
Medalists at the 1974 Asian Games
Asian Games medalists in boxing
Commonwealth Games competitors for Pakistan
Burials at Mewa Shah Graveyard